Pressey is a surname. Notable people with the name include:

 Angela Pressey (born 1986), American volleyball player
 Paul Pressey (born 1958), American basketball player and coach
 Phil Pressey (born 1991), American basketball player
 Sidney L. Pressey (1888–1979), American professor of Psychology

See also
 Pressey House, historic octagon house in Oakland, Maine